Jim Corrigall (born May 7, 1946) is a Canadian former gridiron football player and coach He was all-star defensive lineman for the Toronto Argonauts in the Canadian Football League (CFL). Corrigall served as the head football coach at Kent State University from 1994 to 1997, compiling a record of 8–35–1 He was inducted into the Canadian Football Hall of Fame in 1990.

High school and college
Corrigall played football in high school at Scollard Hall, a private boys' school in North Bay, Ontario, and Barrie North Collegiate, in Barrie, Ontario. He played his college football at Kent State University. During his outstanding university career, Corrigall was selected Most Valuable Sophomore, Best Defensive Lineman, Most Inspirational Player and he was the first Kent State player to be selected to the first team All-Mid-American Conference for three consecutive years. His jersey number 79 was retired by Kent State when he graduated.

Professional playing career
Though drafted by the St. Louis Cardinals of the National Football League (NFL), (2nd round, 33rd overall) Corrigall came home to play an 11-year career with the Toronto Argonauts (from 1970 to 1981), including 148 regular season and 5 playoff games (included in those playoff appearances was the 1971 Grey Cup game). He won the Gruen Trophy as outstanding rookie in the CFL East, would be named an all star 7 times (All Canadian 4 times) and in 1975 he won the CFL's Most Outstanding Defensive Player Award.

Corrigall was honoured as an "All-Time Argo" in 1997 for his contributions to the Argonaut team and was inducted into the Canadian Football Hall of Fame in 1990.

Coaching career
In 1994, Corrigall returned to his alma mater, Kent State, as head football coach. The program had been struggling for years when he arrived and had just come off a winless season in 1993.  Although some progress was made, the Golden Flashes best season under Corrigall, a 3–8 campaign, proved to be his last in 1997.  Three wins in 1997 were the most wins for Kent State since 1988.  Corrigall had an overall record of 8–35–1 in four seasons. In 2012, Corrigall was the defensive line coach for Archbishop Hoban High School (Akron, OH). He led the Knights to an undefeated season. As of October 2020, Corrigall is the head coach for the freshmen team at Akron St. Vincent-St. Mary High School.

Head coaching record

References

1946 births
Living people
American football defensive linemen
Canadian football defensive linemen
Canadian players of American football
Kent State Golden Flashes football coaches
Kent State Golden Flashes football players
Toronto Argonauts players
Canadian Football Hall of Fame inductees
Canadian Football League Most Outstanding Defensive Player Award winners
Canadian Football League Rookie of the Year Award winners
Sportspeople from Barrie
Players of Canadian football from Ontario